Radio 1 Sessions is the second live album released by the Scottish band Big Country, released in 1994.

Track listing
"Close Action" (Big Country) – 3:45
"Heart and Soul" (Big Country) – 4:48
"Harvest Home" (Adamson, Big Country) – 4:06
"Angle Park" (Adamson, Big Country, Watson) – 4:05
"Inwards" (Big Country) – 4:17
"1000 Stars" (Big Country) – 4:21
"Porroh Man" (Big Country) – 7:28
"Close Action" (Big Country) – 3:55

Personnel
Stuart Adamson - guitar, vocals
Mark Brzezicki - drums, percussion
Tony Butler - bass, vocals
Bruce Watson - guitar, vocals

References

Big Country albums
BBC Radio recordings
1994 live albums
1994 compilation albums